Menegazzia pertransita is a species of foliose lichen in the large lichen family Parmeliaceae. It is found in New Zealand, Australia, and South America. The lichen was first formally described by Scottish physician and bryologist James Stirton in 1877 as Parmelia pertransita. Swedish lichenologist Rolf Santesson transferred it to the genus Menegazzia in 1942.

See also
List of Menegazzia species

References

pertransita
Lichen species
Lichens described in 1877
Lichens of Australia
Lichens of New Zealand
Lichens of South America
Taxa named by James Stirton